Su Yuliang (born 26 January 2005) is a Chinese footballer currently playing as a forward for Guangzhou City.

Personal life
Su was born in Guangzhou to a Chinese mother and Nigerian father.

Club career
Su was selected as one of fifty young Chinese footballers to join the academy of Spanish side Atlético Madrid, as part of Wanda Group's "China Football Hope Star" initiative to encourage the development of young Chinese footballers.

On his return to China, he joined the academy of Guangzhou City. He progressed through the club's youth ranks, making his debut in the 2021 Chinese Super League, in a game against Chengdu Rongcheng. In February 2023, he went on trial with Serbian side Red Star Belgrade.

Career statistics

Club
.

References

2005 births
Living people
Footballers from Guangzhou
Chinese footballers
China youth international footballers
Nigerian footballers
Association football forwards
Chinese Super League players
Atlético Madrid footballers
Guangzhou City F.C. players
21st-century Chinese people
Chinese expatriate footballers
Chinese expatriate sportspeople in Spain
Expatriate footballers in Spain